Oncideres is a genus of longhorn beetles of the subfamily Lamiinae, containing more than 120 species in the nearctic and neotropics.

Species 

 Oncideres albipilosa Noguera, 1993
 Oncideres albistillata Dillon & Dillon, 1952
 Oncideres albomaculata Dillon & Dillon, 1946
 Oncideres albomarginata Thomson, 1868
 Oncideres albopicta Martins & Galileo, 1990
 Oncideres alicei Lane, 1977
 Oncideres amo Galileo & Martins, 2008
 Oncideres amputator (Fabricius, 1792)
 Oncideres anama Galileo & Martins, 2010
 Oncideres angaturama Galileo & Martins, 2008
 Oncideres apiaba Martins, 1981
 Oncideres apicalis Dillon & Dillon, 1946
 Oncideres aragua Martins & Galileo, 1990
 Oncideres argentata Dillon & Dillon, 1946
 Oncideres aurivillii Galileo & Martins, 2011
 Oncideres bella Martins & Galileo, 1999
 Oncideres boliviana Heyrovsky, 1952
 Oncideres bondari Melzer, 1923
 Oncideres bouchardi Bates, 1865
 Oncideres bucki Melzer, 1934
 Oncideres canidia Dillon & Dillon, 1946
 Oncideres captiosa Martins, 1981
 Oncideres castanea Dillon & Dillon, 1946
 Oncideres cephalotes Bates, 1865
 Oncideres cervina Thomson, 1868
 Oncideres chagasi Martins, 1981
 Oncideres chevrolatii Thomson, 1868
 Oncideres cingulata (Say, 1826) - Twig Girdler
 Oncideres coites Martins, Galileo & de Oliveira, 2009
 Oncideres colombiana Dillon & Dillon, 1946
 Oncideres crassicornis Bates, 1865
 Oncideres cumdisci Noguera, 1993
 Oncideres dalmani Thomson, 1868
 Oncideres defectiofasciata Gilmour, 1950
 Oncideres dejeanii Thomson, 1868
 Oncideres diana (Olivier, 1792)
 Oncideres digna Bates, 1865
 Oncideres diringsi Martins & Galileo, 1990
 Oncideres disiunctus Galileo & Martins, 2011
 Oncideres dorsomaculata Noguera, 1993
 Oncideres errata Martins & Galileo, 2009
 Oncideres estebani Martins & Galileo, 2010
 Oncideres etiolata Dillon & Dillon, 1946
 Oncideres fabricii Thomson, 1868
 Oncideres fisheri Dillon & Dillon, 1946
 Oncideres fulva Bates, 1865
 Oncideres fulvoguttata Dillon & Dillon, 1946
 Oncideres fulvostillata Bates, 1872
 Oncideres gemmata Dillon & Dillon, 1946
 Oncideres germarii Thomson, 1868
 Oncideres gibbosa Thomson, 1868
 Oncideres glebulenta Martins, 1981
 Oncideres guttulata Thomson, 1868
 Oncideres gutturator (Fabricius, 1775)
 Oncideres hoffmanni Galileo & Martins, 2008
 Oncideres humeralis Thomson, 1868
 Oncideres ilaire Dillon & Dillon, 1946
 Oncideres immensa Martins & Galileo, 2009
 Oncideres impluviata (Germar, 1842)
 Oncideres intermedia Dillon & Dillon, 1946
 Oncideres irrorata Melzer, 1934
 Oncideres jatai Bondar, 1953
 Oncideres laceyi Dillon & Dillon, 1949
 Oncideres limpida Bates, 1865
 Oncideres lyside Dillon & Dillon, 1949
 Oncideres macra Thomson, 1868
 Oncideres maculosus Redtenbacher, 1868
 Oncideres magnifica Martins, 1981
 Oncideres malleri Fragoso, 1970
 Oncideres manauara Martins & Galileo, 1995
 Oncideres maxima Dillon & Dillon, 1946
 Oncideres miliaris (Schönherr, 1817)
 Oncideres miniata Thomson, 1868
 Oncideres minuta Thomson, 1868
 Oncideres mirador Martins, Galileo & de Oliveira, 2009
 Oncideres mirim Martins & Galileo, 1996
 Oncideres modesta Dillon & Dillon, 1946
 Oncideres multicincta Dillon & Dillon, 1946
 Oncideres nicea Dillon & Dillon, 1949
 Oncideres nipheta Martins, 1981
 Oncideres nivea Dillon & Dillon, 1946
 Oncideres ocellaris Bates, 1885
 Oncideres ochreostillata Dillon & Dillon, 1952
 Oncideres ocularis Thomson, 1868
 Oncideres ophthalmalis Dillon & Dillon, 1946
 Oncideres pallifasciata Noguera, 1993
 Oncideres paurosoma Noguera, 1993
 Oncideres pectoralis Thomson, 1868
 Oncideres pepotinga Martins, 1981
 Oncideres phaetusa Dillon & Dillon, 1946
 Oncideres philosipes Dillon & Dillon, 1946
 Oncideres pittieri Gahan, 1894
 Oncideres poecila Bates, 1880
 Oncideres poeta Dillon & Dillon, 1949
 Oncideres polychroma Dillon & Dillon, 1946
 Oncideres pretiosa Martins & Galileo, 1990
 Oncideres pulchella Bates, 1865
 Oncideres punctata Dillon & Dillon, 1946
 Oncideres pustulata LeConte, 1854
 Oncideres putator Thomson, 1868
 Oncideres pyrrothrix Noguera, 1993
 Oncideres quercus Skinner, 1905
 Oncideres repandator (Fabricius, 1792)
 Oncideres rhodosticta Bates, 1885
 Oncideres rubra Franz, 1959
 Oncideres saga (Dalman, 1823)
 Oncideres satyra Bates, 1865
 Oncideres schreiteri Bruch, 1941
 Oncideres scitula Bates, 1880
 Oncideres seabrai Fragoso, 1970
 Oncideres senilis Bates, 1885
 Oncideres sobrina Dillon & Dillon, 1946
 Oncideres sparsemaculatus Martins & Galileo, 2010
 Oncideres stillata Aurivillius, 1904
 Oncideres travassosi Fragoso, 1970
 Oncideres tuberculata Thomson, 1868
 Oncideres tuberosa Martins & Galileo, 2006
 Oncideres ulcerosa (Germar, 1824)
 Oncideres vicina Thomson, 1868
 Oncideres vitiliga Martins, 1981
 Oncideres voetii Thomson, 1868
 Oncideres wappesi Martins & Galileo, 2005
 Oncideres xavieri Galileo & Martins, 2010

References

 
Onciderini